MacDonald Taylor Sr. (born 27 August 1957) is a United States Virgin Islands former international soccer player.

Career
Taylor appeared in four FIFA World Cup qualifying matches for United States Virgin Islands between 2000 and 2004. After playing against Saint Kitts and Nevis in March 2004 at 46, Taylor became the oldest player to appear in a FIFA World Cup qualifying match. He still holds this record for men's football, but has been surpassed in both genders by women's goalkeeper Tonina Dimech who played the 2011 Women's World Cup Qualifiers for Malta in 2010 at 49.

Personal life
His son is MacDonald Taylor Jr.

References

1957 births
Living people
United States Virgin Islands soccer players
United States Virgin Islands international soccer players
Association football defenders